Nizhniye is a rural locality (a settlement) in Semizerye Rural Settlement, Kaduysky District, Vologda Oblast, Russia. The population was 130 as of 2002.

Geography 
It is located 30 km northwest of Kaduy (the district's administrative centre) by road. Nizhniye (village) is the nearest rural locality.

References 

Rural localities in Kaduysky District